This article is about the demography of the population of Trinidad and Tobago including population density, ethnicity, education level, health of the populace, economic status, religious affiliations and other aspects of the population.

Population
The total population of Trinidad and Tobago was 1,328,018 according to the 2011 census, an increase of 5.2% since the 2000 census.
The proportion of children below the age of 15 in 2010 was 20.7%, 71% was between 15 and 65 years of age, while 8.3% was 65 years or older.

Structure of the population 

Structure of the population (09.01.2011) (Census): 

Due to decreasing fertility, the proportion of children below the age of 15 is decreasing, while the proportion of elderly is increasing. The median age has increased from 21.6 in 1980, 24.1 in 1990, 28.1 in 2000 to 32.6 in 2011.
The estimated mid-year population of 2014 is 1,344,000 (medium fertility scenario of The 2012 Revision of the World Population Prospects). As of January 2019, the estimated population is 1,383,368.

Emigration
Emigration from Trinidad and Tobago, as with other Caribbean nations, has historically been high; most emigrants go to the United States, Canada, and Britain. Emigration has continued, albeit at a lower rate, even as the birth-rate sharply dropped to levels typical of industrialised countries. Largely because of this phenomenon, as of 2011, Trinidad and Tobago has been experiencing a low population growth rate (0.48%). More recently, there has been some return migration, chiefly from the United States after the recession of 2008, which caused a population jump in the last census in 2011.

Vital statistics

Life expectancy at birth

Source: UN World Population Prospects

Ethnic groups

Indo-Trinidadian and Tobagonians

Indo-Trinidadians make up the country's largest ethnic group (approximately 35.43%). Indo-Trinidadians are primarily the descendants of indentured workers from India, or the then British India, brought to replace emancipated Africans who refused to continue working under the violent, exploitative conditions on the sugar estates. Through cultural preservation groups, Trinidadians and Tobagonians of Indian descent maintain many of their religions, customs, cuisine, traditions, and language.

Afro-Trinidadian and Tobagonians

Afro-Trinidadian and Tobagonian make up the country's second largest ethnic group (approximately 34.22%). Although enslaved Africans were first imported in 1517, they constituted only 11 percent of the population (310) in 1783.
The majority of the enslaved Africans were brought in the last few years of Trinidad's Spanish Colonial era, and the beginning of the British colonial period. The Cedula of Population transformed a small colony of 1,000 in 1773 to 18,627 by 1797. In the census of 1777 there were only 2,763 people recorded as living on the island, including some 2,000 Arawaks. In 1807, the UK Parliament passed the Slave Trade Act 1807 that abolished the trading of enslaved persons, and the Slavery Abolition Act 1833 abolished the practice of slavery itself.

European Trinidadian and Tobagonians

The European Trinidadian (or White Trinidadian) population is primarily descended from early settlers and immigrants. The recent census counted 7,832 people of European descent. These numbers do not include people who have at least some European ancestry or self-identify as African or Indian.

The French arrived mostly during the Spanish period to take advantage of free agricultural lands. Some Portuguese arrived in the mid-nineteenth century and more came  at the turn of the century. The Europeans who remained in Trinidad live in areas in and around Port of Spain. Furthermore, British rule led to an influx of settlers from the United Kingdom and the British colonies of the Eastern Caribbean and descendants of English indentured workers brought in as overseers following the end of the Second World War.

The Portuguese came to Tobago and Trinidad as early as the 17th century, including groups of Jews, Catholics and Protestants. For over 140 years, from 1834 up to 1975, the ancestors of the modern Portuguese community in Trinidad and Tobago hailed mostly from the archipelago of Madeira, starting from 1846, with the earliest registers being from the Azores in 1834.

Most Portuguese came directly from Madeira, and also via Guyana, St Vincent, Antigua and St Kitts.

Important communities settled in Port of Spain, Arima, Arouca, Chaguanas, San Fernando and Scarborough.

In 2011, the Madeiran Portuguese Community of Trinidad and Tobago celebrated their 165th Anniversary of arrival of the first Madeirans in Trinidad back in 1846.

Recalling the presence of the Portuguese in the nation today are over 100 Portuguese surname, some of which have become street nomenclature. As an independent nation, the country has recognised several members of the Portuguese community, through official awards.

In Tobago, many white residents are retirees who have recently arrived there.

Mixed ethnicity

Given the large number of ethnic identities in Trinidad and Tobago, many citizens have a mixed ethnic heritage due to influences from French, West African, Indian or Han Chinese ancestry. Common ethnic mixtures include people of African and European descent (mulatto-creoles) and African and Indian descent (often colloquially known as dougla). This mixed population is estimated at around 22.8%. A Dougla person might self identify as simply African based on physical appearance, for instance, but they might be genetically more similar to a person of Indian descent.

Chinese-Trinidadians and Tobagonians

There are groups of Chinese who, like the  Indians, are descended from indentured labourers. They account for about 4,000 people and live mostly in Port-of-Spain and San Fernando. 
In Trinidad there were, about twenty years ago [i.e. about 1886], 4,000 or 5,000 Chinese, but they have decreased to probably about 2,000 or 3,000, [2,200 in 1900]. They used to work in sugar plantations, but are now principally shopkeepers,as well as general merchants, miners and railway builders,etc.

Arab-Trinidadians and Tobagonians

There are also more than 1,000 Arabs, originating from Syria and Lebanon who live mostly in Port-of-Spain. The Syrian and Lebanese communities of Trinidad are predominantly Christian, migrating from the Middle East in the 19th century from the Ottoman Empire later landing in the Caribbean and Latin America. Other Lebanese and Syrians came in the early to middle 20th century to escape the war and turmoil in the region.

Indigenous (Caribs)
Finally there are the mixed raced Caribs who are descended from the native, precolonial people of the islands. They are organized around the Santa Rosa Carib Community and live mostly in and around Arima.

Religion

In 2011, according to census, Roman Catholicism was again the largest religious denomination with 285,671 followers (21.6% of the total population), having declined from a membership of 289,711 in 2000 (26% of the population). Other religious denominations that experienced decreases in their membership in 2011 were Hinduism (from 22.5% in 2000 to 18.2% in 2011), Anglican (from 7.8% to 5.7%), Presbyterian/Congregational (from 3.3% to 2.5%) and Methodist (from 0.9% to 0.7%). The number of persons claiming affiliation to Pentecostal/Evangelical/Full Gospel more than doubled from 76,327 in 2000 (6.8%) to 159,033 in 2011 (12.0%). The number of Muslims slightly increased but as proportion of the total population there was a decrease from 5.8% in 2000 to 5.0% in 2011. The category ‘None’ witnessed a small increase from 1.9% to 2.2%, while those who did not state a religion increased significantly, from 1.4% to 11.1%. 1.2% of the population are adherents of the Baháʼí Faith. The African religions and specifically Orisha have become institutions in Trinidad and Tobago's society. They serve not only the obvious religious needs but also as a source of inspiration for personal identity. Many people, motivated by the need to re-claim their African heritage can now openly support these religions because they see in them a source of understanding and a coming to terms with their enslavement and the colonial past.

Language

English and creoles
 
English is the country's official language (the local variety of standard English is Trinidadian and Tobagonian English or more properly, Trinidad and Tobago Standard English, abbreviated as "TTSE"), but the main spoken language is either of two English-based creole languages (Trinidadian Creole or Tobagonian Creole), which reflects the Amerindian, European, African, and Asian heritage of the nation. Both creoles contain elements from a variety of African languages; Trinidadian English Creole, however, is also influenced by French and French Creole (Patois).

Hindustani

The variant that is spoken in Trinidad and Tobago is known as Trinidadian Hindustani, Trinidadian Bhojpuri, Trinidadian Hindi, Indian, Plantation Hindustani, or Gaon ke Bolee (Village Speech). A majority of the early Indian indentured  immigrants spoke the Bhojpuri and Awadhi dialects, which later formed into Trinidadian Hindustani. In 1935, Indian movies began showing to audiences in Trinidad. Most of the Indian movies were in the Standard Hindustani (Hindi-Urdu) dialect and this modified Trinidadian Hindustani slightly by adding Standard Hindi and Urdu phrases and vocabulary to Trinidadian Hindustani. Indian movies also revitalized Hindustani among Indo-Trinidadian and Tobagonians. The British colonial government and estate owners had disdain and contempt for Hindustani and Indian languages in Trinidad. Due to this, many Indians saw it as a broken language keeping them in poverty and bound to the cane fields, and did not pass it on as a first language, but rather as a heritage language, as they favored English as a way out. Around the mid to late 1960s the lingua franca of Indo-Trinidadian and Tobagonians switched from Trinidadian Hindustani to a sort of Hindinized version of English. Today Hindustani survives on through Indo-Trinidadian and Tobagonian musical forms such as, Bhajan, Indian classical music, Indian folk music, Filmi, Pichakaree, Chutney, Chutney soca, and Chutney parang. As of 2003, there are about 15,633 Indo-Trinidadian and Tobagonians who speak Trinidadian Hindustani and as of 2011, there are about 10,000 who speak Standard Hindi. Many Indo-Trinidadians and Tobagonians today speak a type of Hinglish that consists of Trinidadian and Tobagonian English that is heavily laced with Trinidadian Hindustani vocabulary and phrases and many Indo-Trinidadians and Tobagonians can recite phrases or prayers in Hindustani today. There are many places in Trinidad and Tobago that have names of Hindustani origin. Some phrases and vocabulary have even made their way into the mainstream English and English Creole dialect of the country. World Hindi Day is celebrated each year on 10 January with events organized by the National Council of Indian Culture, Hindi Nidhi Foundation, Indian High Commission, Mahatma Gandhi Institute for Cultural Co-operation, and the Sanatan Dharma Maha Sabha.

Spanish

In 2014, Spanish was the native language of 4,000 (0.3% of the total population) people in Trinidad and Tobago, being mostly made up of Venezuelan immigrants. Due to Trinidad and Tobago's proximity to Venezuela, current government regulations require that Spanish be taught in secondary education. Spanish is estimated to be spoken by around 5% of the population and has been promoted by recent governments as a "first foreign language" since March 2005 due to the country's proximity to Venezuela.

Tamil

The Tamil language is spoken by some of the older Tamil (Madrasi) Indo-Trinidadian and Tobagonian population. It is mostly spoken by the few remaining children of indentured Indian laborers from the present-day state of Tamil Nadu in India. Other speakers of the language are recent immigrants from Tamil Nadu.

Chinese

The Chinese language first came to Trinidad and Tobago in 1806, when the British had brought Chinese laborers in order to determine if they were fit to use as laborers after the abolition of slavery. About 2,645 Chinese immigrants arrived in Trinidad as indentured labour between 1853 to 1866. A majority of the people who immigrated in the 19th century were from southern China and spoke the Hakka and Yue dialects of Chinese. In the 20th century after the years of indetureship up to the present-day more Chinese people have immigrated to Trinidad and Tobago for business and they speak the dialects of the indenturees along with other Chinese dialects, such as Mandarin and Min.

Indigenous languages
The indigenous languages were Yao on Trinidad and Karina on Tobago, both Cariban, and Shebaya on Trinidad, which was Arawakan. These languages have been extinct for over a century, but there are attempts to revive the Carib language by the Santa Rosa First Peoples Community.

References

 
Society of Trinidad and Tobago